Athol is a city in Smith County, Kansas, United States.  As of the 2020 census, the population of the city was 41.

History
Athol was founded in 1888. The first post office in Athol was established in February 1888.

Athol was a station and shipping point on the Chicago, Rock Island and Pacific Railroad.

Geography
Athol is located at  (39.765724, -98.920219).

Demographics

2010 census
As of the census of 2010, there were 44 people, 17 households, and 14 families residing in the city. The racial makeup of the city was 88.6% White and 11.4% from two or more races.

There were 17 households, of which 29.4% had children under the age of 18 living with them, 76.5% were married couples living together, 5.9% had a female householder with no husband present, and 17.6% were non-families. 17.6% of all households were made up of individuals, and 5.9% had someone living alone who was 65 years of age or older. The average household size was 2.59 and the average family size was 2.86.

The median age in the city was 41 years. 25% of residents were under the age of 18; 4.7% were between the ages of 18 and 24; 25% were from 25 to 44; 31.8% were from 45 to 64; and 13.6% were 65 years of age or older. The gender makeup of the city was 43.2% male and 56.8% female.

2000 census
As of the census of 2000, there were 51 people, 25 households, and 14 families residing in the city. The racial makeup of the city was 96.08% White and 3.92% from two or more races.

There were 25 households, out of which 24.0% had children under the age of 18 living with them, 52.0% were married couples living together, and 44.0% were non-families. 44.0% of all households were made up of individuals, and 40.0% had someone living alone who was 65 years of age or older. The average household size was 2.04 and the average family size was 2.79.

In the city, the population was spread out, with 19.6% under the age of 18, 5.9% from 18 to 24, 15.7% from 25 to 44, 35.3% from 45 to 64, and 23.5% who were 65 years of age or older. The median age was 48 years. For every 100 females, there were 112.5 males. For every 100 females age 18 and over, there were 95.2 males.

The median income for a household in the city was $28,250, and the median income for a family was $34,375. Males had a median income of $11,250 versus $18,750 for females. The per capita income for the city was $14,872. There were 13.3% of families and 8.5% of the population living below the poverty line, including no under eighteens and 11.8% of those over 64.

Government
The Athol government consists of a mayor and five council members.  The council meets the 1st Wednesday of each month at 7PM.

Education
The community is served by Thunder Ridge USD 110 public school district.

References

Further reading

External links

 Athol - Directory of Public Officials
 Home on the Range Cabin, cabin where the song Home on the Range was written.
 Athol city map, KDOT

Cities in Kansas
Cities in Smith County, Kansas
Populated places established in 1888
1888 establishments in Kansas